Yanni Regäsel (born 13 January 1996) is a German professional footballer who plays as a right-back for Rot-Weiß Koblenz.

Club career
Regäsel made his professional debut for Hertha BSC on 31 October 2015, in a Bundesliga match against Borussia Mönchengladbach in Olympiastadion.

He moved to Eintracht Frankfurt on 1 February 2016.

On 30 May 2018, he was signed by MSV Duisburg for the 2018–19 season. He left Duisburg after the 2018–19 season.

International career
Regäsel is a youth international for Germany.

Honours
Hertha BSC U19
 German U19 Cup: 2014–15

References

External links

1996 births
Living people
Footballers from Berlin
German footballers
Germany youth international footballers
German expatriate footballers
Association football defenders
Hertha BSC players
Hertha BSC II players
Eintracht Frankfurt players
MSV Duisburg players
FC Nitra players
FC Rot-Weiß Koblenz players
Bundesliga players
Regionalliga players
2. Bundesliga players
Slovak Super Liga players
Expatriate footballers in Slovakia
German expatriate sportspeople in Slovakia